Gidh is an unreleased Pakistani action/romance Urdu language film, directed by Shamoon Abbasi. It is produced by J.A.R Production and Shaam Films. The film stars notables from the Pakistan film industry, including Shaan Shahid, Sara Loren, Ayesha Khan and Syed Jibran. Film music is composed by Kamran Akhtar. A trailer for the film was released in October 2014.

Synopsis
Love finds betrayal asking for justice and corruption seeking revenge. All takes place in a world full
of glitz and glamour, where not is all what it seems, and in which the humanity of one man is tested and threatened.  This film is about loss, anger, and revenge entangled in the lives of film stars, press and police.

Cast
 Shaan Shahid
 Humayun Saeed
 Ayesha Khan
 Sara Loren
 Syed Jibran
 Hamza Ali Abbasi
 Rahma Ali

Music
Gidh will have six original songs and be a music driven film. The soundtrack of the film is composed by Kamran Akhtar. According to media reports, Gidh soundtrack features heart-breaking voices like Rahat Fateh Ali Khan, Shujat Ali Khan, Amanat Ali and Indian singer Sukhwinder Singh as playback singers.

References

Unreleased Pakistani films

Pakistani action films